The American International School, Abu Dhabi is a private international K-12 school offering an American curriculum. The college-preparatory IB Diploma Program (IBDP) is offered in grades 11 and 12, and the IB Primary Years Program (IBPYP) is offered from KG to Grade 5. The school is coeducational in elementary, and gender-segregated in secondary.

History of AISA 
The American International School of Abu Dhabi was founded in 1995 by ESOL Education. It was officially founded to serve American and other expatriate communities residing in Abu Dhabi.

Campus details

The school is located in Abu Dhabi, United Arab Emirates. The school has two libraries, a prayer mosque, a drama room, an art room, a music room, a swimming pool, six science laboratories, 2 AstroTurf pitches, two gymnasiums, two outdoor basketball courts, and a sports field used for soccer tournaments and major outdoor events.

The campus accommodates three levels of schooling. The elementary level consists of 700 students, the middle school level consists of 395 students, and the high school level consists of 650 students. The school is coeducational in elementary, and gender-segregated in secondary. The total number of students is approximately 1,380 students, and the students come from around 75 countries.

The American International School, Abu Dhabi's campus is located in proximity to the Embassy of the United States to the United Arab Emirates.

International and national accreditations
AISA is accredited by the Middle States Association of Colleges and Schools, the Council of International Schools, and the UAE Ministry of Education. It is authorized by the International Baccalaureate Organization to offer the Primary Years Programme and the IB Diploma Programs. AISA is a full member of both the Near East South Asian Association of Overseas Schools (NESA) as well as the European Council of International Schools (ECIS).

Curriculum
The school in offers an American high school diploma program and the International Baccalaureate program. Students in Kindergarten to grade 5 follow the U.S. Curriculum within the IB Primary Years Program (IB-PYP). In grades 6–9, students continue to follow the American curriculum. High school students can choose between the U.S. High School Diploma, or the IB Diploma Program. In secondary, student work is graded using Standard Based Grading (SBG).

Arabic and Islamic subjects are maintained by the UAE Ministry of Education, and secondary science subjects follow the Next Generation Science Standards (NGSS).

Activities 

AISA is a member of two leagues, the local UAE league that is composed of international schools in the country, called Emirates Athletics Conference (EAC), and the international league that is participated by the schools from all over the MENA region which is the OASIS Activities Conference (OAC).  Among the sports offered at AISA are basketball, volleyball, badminton, soccer, swimming, and track and field. Other sports such as softball and handball are only played during P.E., but not after school or in a league.

ADEK Inspection Report
The ADEK Inspection Report has labelled the American International School of Abu Dhabi as a "very good" school. Strengths in academics were outlined; however, the report further published shortcomings of the Arabic language curriculum.

See also

 Americans in the United Arab Emirates

References

American international schools in the United Arab Emirates
Schools in the Emirate of Abu Dhabi
International schools in Abu Dhabi
International Baccalaureate schools in the United Arab Emirates
1995 establishments in the United Arab Emirates
Educational institutions established in 1995
Private schools in the United Arab Emirates
International schools in the United Arab Emirates